Kieran Cremin is an Irish Gaelic footballer with the Dr. Crokes club team and formerly with the Kerry county team.

Minor

Cremin was a member of the Kerry team that played in the 1998 All-Ireland Minor Football Championship, winning the Munster Minor Football Championship after a win over Limerick in the final. Cremins side lot out to Laois in the All-Ireland semi-final.

Under 21

He then went on to play with the county u-21 team in the All-Ireland Under-21 Football Championship winning a Munster Under-21 Football Championship in 1999. Kerry later qualified for the All-Ireland final where they had a surprise loss to Westmeath.

He was a member of the team for the next two seasons without success.

Junior

Cremin went on to win a Munster Junior Football Championship with the Kerry junior side in 2002. His side later qualified for the All-Ireland only to suffer a surprise loss to Wicklow.

Cremin was for some time second-choice goalkeeper on the Kerry team.  He was regarded as a talented goalkeeper and a likely successor to Diarmuid Murphy when the latter retired.  Indeed, the Sunday Tribune predicted him as the 2010 All-Star goalkeeper in 2005. . However, by the time Murphy retired in 2010, so had Cremin.

In 2007, he appeared in an All-Ireland Senior Club Football Championship final with Dr. Crokes, although they were controversially defeated in a replay by Crossmaglen Rangers.

References

External links
https://web.archive.org/web/20160303193418/http://www.tribune.ie/2006/12/24/80565
http://83.245.38.233/en/Sport/News/Other-sports/2008/02/14/GAA-Kerry-select-side-for-crunch-clash/?facets/sport-space/north-america-locale/gaa/
https://web.archive.org/web/20051001102636/http://drcrokes.com/seniornews.htm
http://www.breakingnews.ie/archives/?c=SPORT&jp=cweyidmhqlkf&d=2006-03-09

Year of birth missing (living people)
Living people
Gaelic football goalkeepers
Kerry inter-county Gaelic footballers
Dr Crokes Gaelic footballers